Maa Tujhhe Salaam Is a 2002 Indian Hindi-language action film directed by Tinu Verma. The film stars Sunny Deol, Tabu and Arbaaz Khan. It was released on 25 January 2002.

Plot 
An Indian military officer, Major Pratap Singh, aborts a terrorist infiltration attempt of the enemy country single-handedly with the help of a few local civilians, at an area that's located near the border of India.

Zhonabad is the name of the area that is located at the high-altitude mountain ravines. In this area lives a man called Lala. Since his ancestors were landlords before independence, Lala is a much respected and influential man there. But behind the curtain, he  is a Pakistani agent who helps infiltration of terrorists and ammunition through the passes in mountains known to him and his men only. In the winter season, the weather conditions become unfit for inhabitants of the area, who are forced to shift to other places from there. Lala takes advantage of this situation and carries out his activities.

Albaksh is an illiterate person. He works like a slave for Lala, without knowing that Lala is indulging in anti-national activities. He is Lala's main henchman.

Captain Sonia, a military intelligence officer, discovers Lala and Albaksh's anti-national activities and informs the military. The military authorities order Major Pratap to go to Zhonabad to keep an eye on Lala and Albaksh. In the meanwhile, Albaksh learns of Lala's activities. He opposes Lala, but invites his wrath in turn. Lala frames and portrays Alabksh as a traitor and terrorist in the eyes of law. The police arrest Albaksh.

Subsequently, Major Pratap meets Albaksh, who reveals Lala's activities and also how he is all set to help the infiltrators into the country through Zhonabad. Since there isn't much time for the Indian military force to reach Zhonabad, Major Pratap decides to fight the battle alone with the help of Albaksh and the local people.

In the final scene, Major Pratap, arming himself with an arsenal of firearms, attacks a large terrorist force of Gul Mastan and Lala and with the help of Albaksh and some Indian soldiers, manages to wipe out the entire force. Major Pratap incapacitates Gul, while Albaksh thrusts a knife through Lala, ending the terrorist threat. Major Pratap, despite being mortally wounded, manages to survive thanks to the prayers and well wishes of the Indian army, who belong to various faiths and religions.

Cast 
 Sunny Deol as Major Pratap Singh
 Tabu as Captain Sonia Khanna
 Arbaaz Khan as Albaksh
 Monal as Nargis
 Tinu Verma as the Lala Sultan
 Mohan Joshi as Col Khanna
 Sudesh Berry as Gul Mastan
 Sharat Saxena as Capt Diler Singh
 Vivek Shauq as Capt. Purushottam
 Deep Dhillon as Bakhtawar
 Brij Gopal as Terrorist
 Ali Khan as Imran
 Rana Jung Bahadur as Inspector Ali Khan
 Jeetu Verma as Sajid
 Prithvi as Satya
 Anang Desai as Shiva
 Avtar Gill as Maulvi
 Inder Kumar as Capt. Irshaad Khan
 Nawab Shah as Nawab
 Rajat Bedi as Capt. Arshad Khan (guest appearance)
 Malaika Arora as an item number "Sone Ke Jaisi Hai Meri Jawaani"
 Vikranta Sandhu as Khan
 Sheela Sharma as Shiva's wife

Soundtrack

Reception 
Radhika Rajamani of The Hindu wrote, "The film salutes the motherland and its soldiers but at the cost of a slow-paced, non-gripping and expected narrative which does not infuse much enthusiasm or interest". Sukanya Verma of Rediff.com said, "Call it a sham, an action-packed masala potboiler, a revenge drama, a love story. Contrary to its title, Maa Tujhe Salaam is anything but a patriotic film". Sify said, "There are many aspects that should make it a success, especially the INDO-PAK theme and the hard-hitting dialogues that are sure to be remembered for years".

References

External links 
 

2000s Hindi-language films
2000s masala films
2002 action films
2002 films
Films about terrorism in India
Films directed by Tinu Verma
Films scored by Sajid–Wajid
India–Pakistan relations in popular culture
Indian action films